Ramon Bautista Revilla Sr. (born Jose Acuña Bautista; March 8, 1927 – June 26, 2020), popularly known simply as Ramon Revilla Sr.,  was a Filipino actor who served as Senator of the Republic of the Philippines.

He was known as the "Hari ng Agimat and King Of True To Life Story in Philippine films.

Education
Revilla graduated in Far Eastern University wherein he finished his bachelor's degree in commerce.

Film career
In his initial entry to the film industry, the young Revilla was cast only in bit roles which was not enough for him so he left the film industry to become head of the Secret Service Unit of the Bureau of Customs in 1965.

He returned to the film industry in 1972 with the film Nardong Putik: Kilabot ng Cavite, which started his fame.

He also returned on his own terms, creating his own film production, Imus Productions, for him to star in. Together with partner Azucena, they ran the film outfit with Revilla writing and directing his films.

His characters in the films "Pepeng Agimat" and "Nardong Putik" gave him the image of being an invincible superhuman who had in his keeping a special anting-anting (amulet of superhuman powers). This image of his is somewhat alive because ABS-CBN adapted his 4 major films into television series entitled Agimat: Ang Mga Alamat ni Ramon Revilla.

Accolades
In 1973, Revilla won a Famas Best Actor Award for "Hulihin si Tiyagong Akyat" together with his son Marlon Bautista for a Famas Best Child Actor Award of the same movie. Imus Productions was also recognized as Outstanding Film production in 1975. The next year, Revilla snagged the Outstanding Producer of the Year Award.

In 1979, he was Most Outstanding Actor and Box Office King.

In 2011, in the 33rd Catholic Mass Media Awards Night (CMMA), Ramon Revilla Sr. was given the Lifetime Achievement Award.

Political career
In 1992, Revilla became a senator, holding office until the end of his two terms in 2004.

Despite having a number of detractors, Senator Ramon Revilla Sr. was able to mark his tenure in the senate as the author of some important bills. But the one he spearheaded that raised his popularity was the bill casually called the "Revilla Bill".

An amendment to the Family Code Law of the Philippines, enacted into the law in February 2004, states "The illegitimate children may use the surname of their father if their affiliation has been expressly recognized by the father through the record of birth appearing in the civil register, or when an admission in a public document or private handwritten instrument is made by the father."

"The child should not suffer the stigma of his illegitimacy," the Revilla Sr. was once quoted as saying.

Ram Revilla murder
On October 17, 2013, Revilla broke his silence and officially aired his emotions about Ram Revilla's murder case and Ramon Joseph's detainment:

Personal life and death
Revilla was the youngest child of the 10 children of businessman Ildefonso Bautista and Andrea Acuña.

His first family was with the mother of Evelyn Bautista, wife of former basketball player and former Senator Robert Jaworski.

His wife Azucena Mortel was born on February 16, 1944, and died on May 31, 1998, aged 54. They produced seven children; namely, Marlon, Rowena Bautista-Mendiola, Jose Marie (Bong Revilla), Rebecca Bautista-Ocampo (Princess Revilla), Edwin (Strike Revilla), Andrea Bautista-Ynares, and Diana. With his extramarital affairs, his children numbered at least 39; Bong's spokesperson Portia Ilagan claimed that the number reached 72. In a 2004 interview with journalist Jessica Soho, Revilla admitted that he probably has more than 80 children. Actor Ram Revilla and film producer and politician Ramon Nicolas Bautista were two of his children from his extra-marital affairs.

On May 31, 2020, Revilla was rushed to the St. Dominic Medical Center in Bacoor, Cavite. The next day, he transferred hospital at the St. Luke's Medical Center in Bonifacio Global City, Taguig. Revilla Sr. died of heart failure at 5:20pm on June 26, 2020, aged 93.

Legacy

Revilla statue
On his 90th birthday, a statue was unveiled to the public. The 10-meter bronze statue was made by Filipino sculptor and national artist Eduardo Castrillo. It was unveiled at Revilla's residence in Bacoor, Cavite. Also during this event, Revilla's children gave him another surprise by officially opening the "Memo Revilla," a museum showcasing his old photographs and film memorabilia such as the "anting-anting" (amulet) and "panday" (sword). His star-studded birthday celebration was attended by the biggest names in Philippine show business and politics alike. Former presidents Joseph Ejercito Estrada and Gloria Macapagal Arroyo were among the big personalities who came to the event.

Filmography

References

1927 births
2020 deaths
Far Eastern University alumni
Filipino actor-politicians
Filipino male film actors
Filipino people of Spanish descent
Filipino Roman Catholics
Senators of the 9th Congress of the Philippines
Senators of the 10th Congress of the Philippines
Senators of the 11th Congress of the Philippines
Senators of the 12th Congress of the Philippines
Lakas–CMD (1991) politicians
Laban ng Demokratikong Pilipino politicians
Male actors from Cavite
People from Imus
Ramon Sr.